Oued Irara–Krim Belkacem Airport  is an airport serving Hassi Messaoud, a city in the Ouargla Province of eastern Algeria. The airport is named for Krim Belkacem (1922–1970), an Algerian revolutionary fighter and politician.

Airlines and destinations

Statistics

References

External links
 Google Maps - Oued Irara
 Great Circle Mapper - Oued Irara

 

Airports in Algeria
Articles containing video clips
Buildings and structures in Ouargla Province